Baron Coleraine is a title that has been created three times, twice in the Peerage of Ireland and once in the Peerage of the United Kingdom.

The first creation came in the Peerage of Ireland in 1625 for the courtier Hugh Hare. This creation became extinct on the death of the third Baron in 1749.

The second creation came in the Peerage of Ireland in 1762 in favour of Gabriel Hanger, Member of Parliament for Maidstone and Bridgwater. The third Baron represented East Retford, Aldborough and Mitchell in the House of Commons. The fourth Baron was a soldier, politician and eccentric. The title became extinct on his death in 1824.

The third creation came in the Peerage of the United Kingdom in 1954 when the Conservative politician Richard Law was made Baron Coleraine, of Haltemprice in the East Riding of the County of York. He was the youngest son of the former Prime Minister Bonar Law.  the title is held by the first Baron's grandson, the third Baron, who succeeded in 2020.

The family seat is The Dower House, near Sunderlandwick, East Riding of Yorkshire.

Barons Coleraine, first creation (1625)
Hugh Hare, 1st Baron Coleraine (1606–1667)
Henry Hare, 2nd Baron Coleraine (1636–1708)
Hon. Hugh Hare (1668–1707) 
Henry Hare, 3rd Baron Coleraine (1694–1749)

Barons Coleraine, second creation (1762)
Gabriel Hanger, 1st Baron Coleraine (1697–1773)
John Hanger, 2nd Baron Coleraine (1743–1794)
William Hanger, 3rd Baron Coleraine (1744–1814)
George Hanger, 4th Baron Coleraine (1751–1824)

Barons Coleraine, third creation (1954)
Richard Kidston Law, 1st Baron Coleraine (1901–1980)
James Martin Bonar Law, 2nd Baron Coleraine (1931–2020)
James Peter Bonar Law, 3rd Baron Coleraine (b. 1975)

The heir presumptive to the peerage is the present holder's uncle, Hon. Andrew Bonar Law (b. 1933), whose son and heir, and the last heir-in-line to the title, is Richard Pitcairne Bonar Law (b. 1963)

References

Kidd, Charles, Williamson, David (editors). Debrett's Peerage and Baronetage (1990 edition). New York: St Martin's Press, 1990.

 
1625 establishments in Ireland
1749 disestablishments in Ireland
1762 establishments in Ireland
1824 disestablishments in Ireland
1954 establishments in the United Kingdom
Extinct baronies in the Peerage of Ireland
Baronies in the Peerage of the United Kingdom
Noble titles created in 1625
Noble titles created in 1762
Noble titles created in 1954
Noble titles created for UK MPs